The Taupō Fault Belt contains many almost parallel faults and is located in the Taupō Rift of the central North Island of New Zealand between Lake Taupō and Lake Rotorua.

Geology
The Taupō Fault Belt  is in the area also referred to as either the Paeroa Graben or the Kapenga Graben between the Horohoro Fault and the Paeroa Fault. Aligned with the orientation of the modern Taupō Rift are multiple north-north-east trending normal faults. These include the Ngakuru Fault to the east with the Ngakuru Graben between it and the Whirinaki Fault. The tectonic activity is driven by the ground subsiding at a rate of 3-4 mm/yr since 61,000 years ago with largely orthogonal rifting associated with subduction and the clockwise rotation of the northern North Island allowing the rift to open.

References

Seismic faults of New Zealand
Taupō Volcanic Zone